Microtes is a genus of band-winged grasshoppers in the family Acrididae. There are at least 3 described species in Microtes.

Species
 Microtes helferi (Strohecker, 1960)
 Microtes occidentalis (Bruner, 1893) (little buzzer grasshopper)
 Microtes pogonata (Strohecker, 1963)

References

Further reading

 
 

Oedipodinae